The Pennsylvania State Game Lands Number 41 are Pennsylvania State Game Lands in Bedford and Blair Counties in Pennsylvania in the United States providing hunting, bird watching, and other activities.

Geography
State Game Lands Number 41 consists of two parcels located in Bloomfield and Woodbury Townships in Bedford County near the villages of Bakers Summit, Morrisons Cove, and New Enterprise. Three small parcels are located in Greenfield Township in Blair County. The western parcel is located on the eastern slope of Dunning Mountain, however, the slope averages 30% or more, making accessibility very difficult. The National Map by the United States Geological Survey indicates four additional small parcels labelled as belonging to SGL41, the Pennsylvania Game Commission map only indicates the two parcels discussed in this article.

Pennsylvania Route 36 is east of the main parcel and is north and south oriented, Pennsylvania Route 868 passes between the parcels and is also north and south oriented.

Statistics

Biology
Hunting and furtaking species include coyote (Canis latrans), white-tailed deer (Odocoileus virginianus), ruffed grouse (Bonasa umbellus), Raccoon (Procyon lotor), gray squirrel, (Sciurus carolinensis), and turkey (Meleagris gallopavo).

See also
 Pennsylvania State Game Lands
 Pennsylvania State Game Lands Number 26, also located in Bedford County
 Pennsylvania State Game Lands Number 48, also located in Bedford County
 Pennsylvania State Game Lands Number 49, also located in Bedford County
 Pennsylvania State Game Lands Number 73, also located in Bedford County
 Pennsylvania State Game Lands Number 97, also located in Bedford County
 Pennsylvania State Game Lands Number 104, also located in Bedford County
 Pennsylvania State Game Lands Number 261, also located in Bedford County

References

041
Protected areas of Bedford County, Pennsylvania
Protected areas of Blair County, Pennsylvania